Novaya Derevnya railway station is a railway station located at the Kolomyazhskiy Prospekt overpass in Primorsky District, St. Petersburg.

The station was opened on 23 July 1893 as part of the Ozerki line built by the JSC Prinorskaya Saint Peterburg–Sestroretsk railway. It became the main station of the line and the depot and warehouses were constructed there. The wooden station building and towers behind the Severny factory fence remain as of 2009.

References 

Railway stations in the Russian Empire opened in 1893
Railway stations in Saint Petersburg